Stachowiak is a surname of Polish-language origin. It may refer to:
 Adam Stachowiak (born 1986), Polish footballer
 Adam Stachowiak (cyclist) (born 1989), Polish racing cyclist
 Clement Stachowiak (1902–1981), American politician
 Dariusz Stachowiak (born 1984), Polish footballer
  (1921–2004), German philosopher
 Maciej Stachowiak (born 1976), Polish programmer
 Mirosława Stachowiak-Różecka (born 1973), Polish politician

See also

References

Polish-language surnames